Souleymane Diallo (born 12 February 1937) is a French boxer. He competed in the men's light middleweight event at the 1960 Summer Olympics.

References

External links
 

1937 births
Living people
French male boxers
Olympic boxers of France
Boxers at the 1960 Summer Olympics
Sportspeople from Dakar
Mediterranean Games gold medalists for France
Mediterranean Games medalists in boxing
Competitors at the 1959 Mediterranean Games
Light-middleweight boxers